The Rubicon is an underground river in the province of Liège in the northern-central part of Belgium. It flows through the Caves of Remouchamps, where the world's longest underground trip by boat in a cave is possible .

Rivers of the Ardennes (Belgium)
Rivers of Belgium
Rivers of Liège Province
Caves of Belgium